Alone Together is the fifth studio album by American pop singer Donny Osmond, released in 1973. It reached number 26 on the Billboard pop albums chart on May 12, 1973.  Two singles were released in support of the album, "The Twelfth of Never" and "Young Love," reaching No. 8 and No. 23 on the Billboard Hot 100 singles chart, respectively. The album was certified Gold in the U.K. on December 1, 1973.

Track listing

Charts

Certifications and sales

References

1973 albums
Donny Osmond albums
Albums produced by Don Costa
Albums produced by Michael Lloyd (music producer)
MGM Records albums